Wallendorf (Luppe) is a village and a former municipality in the Saalekreis district, Saxony-Anhalt, Germany. Since 31 December 2009, it is part of the municipality Schkopau.

Former municipalities in Saxony-Anhalt
Saalekreis